Gregor Terdič (born June 7, 1977 in Medvode) is a Slovenian slalom canoeist who competed from the mid-1990s to the early 2000s. He won a bronze medal in the C-1 team event at the 1997 ICF Canoe Slalom World Championships in Três Coroas.

Terdič also finished 24th in the C-1 event at the 1996 Summer Olympics in Atlanta.

References

1977 births
Canoeists at the 1996 Summer Olympics
Living people
Olympic canoeists of Slovenia
Slovenian male canoeists
People from the Municipality of Medvode
Medalists at the ICF Canoe Slalom World Championships